The Palm Vx was a personal digital assistant made by the Palm Computing division of 3Com. It benefited from the sleek design and low weight of its predecessor, the Palm V, while increasing the available storage to 8 MB. At 114 grams, it was one of the lightest models ever offered by Palm. Retail price at launch was US$399.

Soon after the release of the Vx, Palm Computing was spun off to form Palm, Inc. As a result, later-production Palm Vx units were the first Palm devices to no longer carry "3Com" branding.

Features

The Vx is based on the Palm V design, with the primary difference between the two being the Vx's 8 megabytes of RAM compared to the V's 2 megabytes. This was one of the last Palm models not to include a memory slot. It was also one of the first to feature interaction with email, AvantGo, and other online programs.

The Vx is powered by a Motorola Dragonball EZ processor operating at 20 MHz. It was originally equipped with Palm OS 3.3, but later models came with Palm OS 3.5. An upgrade to Palm OS 4.1 was formerly offered for sale on the Palm Website but is no longer available.

The device has a built in rechargeable battery (not replaceable unless the unit is disassembled), and a button on the top of the screen that permitted access to a contrast menu. It also includes an illumination feature, which causes the screen to be backlit by a green glow. However, the default backlight behaviour was inverted so that the text glowed while the background remained dark. This had the unfortunate side effect of making backlit pictures appear as negative images and made the display hard to read if the ambient lighting was at the same level as the backlight. The screen is very crisp and clear in bright sunlight and total darkness.

Special editions

On August 1, 2000, Palm announced the release of a "Claudia Schiffer Edition" of the Palm Vx. The Palm Vx CSE featured a blue brushed-metal finish instead of the usual silver color, and came pre-loaded with a HealtheTec diet, exercise, and weight management software package, and Abroad!, a travel organization program. The device was sold exclusively through the supermodel's website, and retailed for US$399.
Palm also released limited edition, colored versions of the Palm Vx without special branding. The special edition was offered in "gold" and "millennium blue". There is also the "Palm CreSenda" edition with a blue faceplate reflecting the corporate color of CreSenda Wireless.

References

External links
Palm.com Details
3Com Debuts Special Edition Palm Computing Organizers for Holiday Season, 3Com/Palm Press Release, October 4, 1999

Palm OS devices
Computer-related introductions in 1999
68k-based mobile devices